Dödevi is a small village on the island Öland. It lies next to the Swedish road 136. The village belongs to the municipality Borgholm.

Populated places in Borgholm Municipality